The One Hundred Thirty-Fifth Ohio General Assembly is the current meeting of the Ohio state legislature, composed of the Ohio Senate and the Ohio House of Representatives.  It convened in Columbus, Ohio on January 3, 2023, and is scheduled to adjourn on December 31, 2024.  The apportionment of legislative districts was based on the 2020 United States census and the 2022 redistricting plan. The Ohio Republican Party retained the majority in both the Ohio Senate and Ohio House of Representatives.

Party summary 
Resignations and new members are discussed in the "Changes in membership" section, below.

Senate

House of Representatives

Leadership

Membership

Senate

House of Representatives

Changes in membership

Senate

House of Representatives

Committees 
Listed alphabetically by chamber, including Chairperson and Ranking Member.

Senate

House of Representatives

Joint Committees

See also 

 List of Ohio state legislatures

References 

Ohio legislative sessions
2023 U.S. legislative sessions
2024 U.S. legislative sessions
2023 in Ohio